jPOS is a free and open source library/framework that provides a high-performance bridge between card messages generated at the point of sale or ATM terminals and internal systems along the entire financial messaging network. jPOS is an enabling technology that can be used to handle all card processing from messaging, to processing, through reporting.

It can be used to implement financial interchanges based on the ISO 8583 standard and related protocols and currently supports versions 1987, 1993 and 2003 of the standard as well as multiple ANSX9.24 standards.

As such, it serves as the messaging foundation for systems that exchange electronic transactions made by cardholders using payment cards. Whether an organization is tracking millions of transactions daily or tens of thousands, jPOS can be implemented to create a clean, efficient financial solution for documenting data associated with all transactions.

References 
Ohloh

Free software programmed in Java (programming language)
Java platform
Java (programming language) libraries